John Catanzara is an American police union leader, and former member of the Chicago Police Department.  Since May 2020, Catanzara has been president of Lodge 7 of the Fraternal Order of Police. He joined the Chicago Police Department in 1995 and was placed on administrative leave after filing a report against former Police Superintendent Eddie T. Johnson.  Catanzara resigned from the CPD in November 2021, as his firing from the CPD appeared imminent, and announced his intention to run for mayor of Chicago.

Early life 
Catanzara was raised in Garfield Ridge, Chicago. His father was a truck driver and active union member. After graduating from St Rita High School, Catanzara worked as a truck driver.

Career 
Catanzara joined the Chicago Police Department in 1995. In 2020, Catanzara was elected as the head of the Chicago Fraternal Order of Police (FOP). Previously in 2017, Cataranza stated of Muslims: "Savages they all deserve a bullet." Later he defended the 2021 storming of the United States Capitol by Trump supporters, stating that: "They’re individuals ... They get to do what they want." Catanzara has faced numerous complaints of misconduct during his over 20-year career as a CPD officer. 

He was assigned as the school officer at Hubbard High School for several years where he coached the cross country and was involved with the school's Junior Reserve Officers' Training Corps program. In February 2021, Catanzara was suspended without pay from the Chicago Police Department for authoring a series of obscene and inflammatory social media posts, making false reports and being insubordinate or disrespectful to supervisors. In August 2021, he was criticized by mayor Lori Lightfoot, the Anti-Defamation League, and the American Jewish Committee for his comments comparing vaccine mandates to The Holocaust.

In October 2021, Catanzara urged union police officers to file exemptions for the city's COVID vaccine reporting mandate and hold off on reporting vaccination status while on-going discussion between F.O.P. police union and city officials continue. 

In November 2021, Catanzara resigned from the CPD amid a disciplinary case against him in regards to alleged departmental rule violations, inflammatory social media posts, and creating false reports against superior officers. Catanzara announced his candidacy for the 2023 Chicago mayoral election. After Catanzara was disqualified, he endorsed Paul Vallas, the only other white candidate running for mayor at the time.

In March 2023, Catanzara was reelected as union president of the Chicago FOP, with 57% of the vote.

Personal life 
Catanzara had a son at the age of 22. Cantanzara is a supporter of Donald Trump.

References

External links
 

Living people
Year of birth missing (living people)
Place of birth missing (living people)
Chicago Police Department officers
Politicians from Chicago
Trade unionists from Illinois
21st-century American politicians